Gerson Rodrigues Correia Leal (born 20 June 1995) is a professional footballer who plays as a midfielder for Al-Wehda, on loan from Ukrainian Premier League club Dynamo Kyiv. Born in Portugal, he represents the Luxembourg national team.

A goalscoring midfielder, Rodrigues is the first Luxembourgish footballer to play in the group stage of the UEFA Champions League.

Club career

Early career
Rodrigues was born in the Portuguese town of Pragal, near Lisbon. He began his youth career in France with FC Metz. He was unable to make a breakthrough into the first-team squad at Metz and went on to play club football in Luxembourg for FC Swift Hesperange, Racing FC Union Luxembourg CS Fola Esch. From there, he moved to SC Telstar in the Netherlands.

On 30 January 2018, Rodrigues signed for Sheriff Tiraspol. On 10 July 2018, he made his debut in the UEFA Champions League qualifying round against Torpedo Kutaisi. After winning the league title with Sheriff in Moldova, Rodrigues signed for Júbilo Iwata on 16 January 2019. He quickly became a key player for Júbilo, scoring 7 goals in 18 matches for the club.

Dynamo Kyiv

2019–20 season
On 2 August 2019, Rodrigues signed a contract with FC Dynamo Kyiv. On 31 January 2020, Rodrigues moved on loan to Ankaragücü in the Turkish Süper Lig for the remainder of the season.  Rodrigues and teammate Ante Kulušić were involved in a training ground dust-up in July 2020. He was removed from the squad for the following match against Galatasaray and his loan was subsequently ended. In his time with Ankaragücü, Rodrigues scored six goals and notched one assist in 11 league matches as the club finished in last place but were saved from relegation as the league was expanded to 21 clubs for the 2020–21 Süper Lig season because of complications from the COVID-19 pandemic in Turkey.

2020–21 season: Double winners
In the Ukrainian Super Cup on 25 August 2020, Rodrigues scored the winning goal in an eventual 3–1 triumph over rivals Shakhtar Donetsk. On 15 September, Rodrigues opened the scoring against Dutch side AZ Alkmaar in the third qualifying round of the UEFA Champions League as his side won 2–0. Rodrigues scored from the penalty spot in the play-off round against Belgian side Gent, capping a 5–1 win on aggregate and securing a place in the group stage. Rodrigues featured in the club's first group stage match against Italian giants Juventus on 20 October, and in doing so became the first Luxembourgish player to play in the group stage of the Champions League.

Rodrigues was an important member of the Dynamo Kyiv squad that won the domestic double of the Ukrainian Premier League and Ukrainian Cup during the 2020–21 season.

2021–22 season: Loans to Troyes and Eyüpspor
On 31 August 2021, Rodrigues joined newly promoted Ligue 1 side Troyes on a season-long loan. The club held an option to make the deal permanent at the end of the season.

On 7 March 2022, FIFA announced that, due to the Russian invasion of Ukraine, all the contracts of foreign players in Ukraine are suspended until 30 June 2022 and they are allowed to sign with clubs outside Ukraine until that date. On 30 March 2022, Rodrigues signed with Turkish club Eyüpspor until 30 June 2022 using the new rule.

International career
Rodrigues made his international debut for Luxembourg in 2017. On 21 March 2019, he scored his first goal for the national team and Luxembourg's second of the match, as they came back from a goal behind against Lithuania to win 2–1 in UEFA Euro 2020 qualification. On 27 March 2021, Rodrigues scored the only goal in a famous 1–0 victory away to Ireland in 2022 FIFA World Cup qualification. Three days later, Rodrigues followed this up by scoring the opening goal for Luxembourg against his country of birth, European champions Portugal, to take a shock lead, but they eventually fell to a 1–3 defeat.

Career statistics

Club

International

Scores and results list Luxembourg's goal tally first.

Honours
Sheriff Tiraspol
Divizia Nationala: 2018

Dynamo Kyiv
Ukrainian Premier League: 2020–21
Ukrainian Cup: 2020–21
Ukrainian Super Cup: 2019, 2020

Personal life
Rodrigues became a Luxembourgish citizen in March 2017 after officially requesting it to the authorities. He thus became immediately eligible for the national team. He still retains his Portuguese citizenship as of today.

References

External links

 
 

1995 births
Living people
Sportspeople from Almada
Luxembourg international footballers
Portuguese footballers
FC Swift Hesperange players
Racing FC Union Luxembourg players
CS Fola Esch players
Luxembourg National Division players
SC Telstar players
Eerste Divisie players
FC Sheriff Tiraspol players
Moldovan Super Liga players
Júbilo Iwata players
J1 League players
Ukrainian Premier League players
FC Dynamo Kyiv players
Süper Lig players
MKE Ankaragücü footballers
ES Troyes AC players
Eyüpspor footballers
Ligue 1 players
Al-Wehda Club (Mecca) players
Saudi Professional League players
Luxembourgian people of Portuguese descent
Luxembourgian people of Cape Verdean descent
Portuguese people of Cape Verdean descent
Portuguese emigrants to Luxembourg
Association football midfielders
Luxembourgian footballers
Luxembourgian expatriate footballers
Expatriate footballers in Ukraine
Luxembourgian expatriate sportspeople in Ukraine
Expatriate footballers in Turkey
Luxembourgian expatriate sportspeople in Turkey
Expatriate footballers in Moldova
Luxembourgian expatriate sportspeople in Moldova
Expatriate footballers in the Netherlands
Luxembourgian expatriate sportspeople in the Netherlands
Expatriate footballers in Japan
Luxembourgian expatriate sportspeople in Japan
Expatriate footballers in France
Luxembourgian expatriate sportspeople in France
Expatriate footballers in Saudi Arabia